Lion's Paw may refer to:
                                             
 Lion's Paw, an honor society at Pennsylvania State University 
 Lion's paw scallop, Nodipecten nodosus
 The Lion's Paw, a 1946 book by Robb White

See also
Androcles and the Lion (disambiguation)
St. Jerome
The Lion and the Mouse